Alfredo Challenger-Calix (born 21 August 1979) is a Caymanian footballer who plays as a midfielder. He has represented the Cayman Islands during World Cup qualifying matches in 2004, 2008 and 2011.

References

Association football midfielders
Living people
1979 births
Caymanian footballers
Cayman Islands international footballers
Latinos FC players